Taber was a provincial electoral district in Alberta, Canada, mandated to return a single member to the Legislative Assembly of Alberta from 1913 to 1963.

History
The Taber electoral district was formed prior to the 1913 Alberta general election from the south-eastern portion of the Lethbridge District.

The Taber electoral district would be abolished prior to the 1963 Alberta general election, and the territory would be split between the Taber-Warner and Little Bow electoral districts.

Members of the Legislative Assembly (MLAs)

Election results

1913 general election

1917 general election

1921 general election

1926 general election

1930 general election

1935 general election

1940 general election

1944 general election

1948 general election

1952 general election

1955 general election

1959 general election

Plebiscite results

1957 liquor plebiscite

On October 30, 1957 a stand alone plebiscite was held province wide in all 50 of the then current provincial electoral districts in Alberta. The government decided to consult Alberta voters to decide on liquor sales and mixed drinking after a divisive debate in the legislature. The plebiscite was intended to deal with the growing demand for reforming antiquated liquor control laws.

The plebiscite was conducted in two parts. Question A, asked in all districts, asked the voters if the sale of liquor should be expanded in Alberta, while Question B, asked in a handful of districts within the corporate limits of Calgary and Edmonton, asked if men and women should be allowed to drink together in establishments.

Province wide Question A of the plebiscite passed in 33 of the 50 districts while Question B passed in all five districts. Taber strongly voted against the proposal. The voter turnout in the district was light, and fell below the province wide average of 46%.

Official district returns were released to the public on December 31, 1957. The Social Credit government in power at the time did not consider the results binding. However the results of the vote led the government to repeal all existing liquor legislation and introduce an entirely new Liquor Act.

Municipal districts lying inside electoral districts that voted against the plebiscite such as Taber were designated Local Option Zones by the Alberta Liquor Control Board and considered effective dry zones. Business owners who wanted a license had to petition for a binding municipal plebiscite in order to be granted a license.

See also
List of Alberta provincial electoral districts
Taber, a town in southern Alberta

References

Further reading

External links
Elections Alberta
The Legislative Assembly of Alberta

Former provincial electoral districts of Alberta